The 1902 Franklin & Marshall football team was an American football team that represented Franklin & Marshall College during the 1902 college football season. The team compiled a 7–2 record and outscored opponents by a total of 282 to 54.  John Chalmers was the team's head coach.

Schedule

References

Franklin and Marshall
Franklin & Marshall Diplomats football seasons
Franklin and Marshall football